Marc France Eddy Balancy (born 6 May 1953) is a Mauritian attorney general and politician. He served as acting president of Mauritius between 26 November and 2 December 2019.

Barlen Vyapoory, who has been carrying out this duty in acting capacity and had been the vice president since 2016, assumed the duty temporarily on 23 March 2018 after the resignation of the then-president Ameenah Gurib-Fakim, but with the statement he made on 26 November 2019, he announced his resignation. Balancy, who served as the Attorney General after this development, was temporarily appointed to this office until the new president was elected. However, instead of Balancy, who held this post until 2 December, the National Assembly appointed Prithvirajsing Roopun on that date.

References

1953 births
Living people
Presidents of Mauritius
20th-century Mauritian judges
Attorneys general of Mauritius